Arbelodes griseata is a moth in the family Cossidae. It is found in South Africa, where it has been recorded from Gauteng, the North-West Province and the Limpopo Province. The habitat consists of moist/dystrophic subtropical savannas and arid/eutrophic savannas.

The length of the forewings is about 10 mm. The forewings are ecru-olive, covered with deep olive-buff spots and lunules at the costal margin and termen. The hindwings are glossy ecru-olive.

References

Natural History Museum Lepidoptera generic names catalog

Endemic moths of South Africa
Moths described in 1925
Metarbelinae